The 1st Annual European Film Awards, presented by the European Film Academy, recognized excellence in European cinema. The ceremony took place on 1 December 1988 at the Theater des Westens in West Berlin and was hosted by Luxembourgish presenter Desirée Nosbusch and German actor Jan Niklas.

British film Distant Voices, Still Lives led the nominations with five but the films Wings of Desire, Pelle the Conqueror and Women on the Verge of a Nervous Breakdown got the most wins with two each. Krzysztof Kieślowski's A Short Film About Killing received the award for Best European Film.

The Lifetime Achievement Award was awarded to two iconic European directors, to Swedish director Ingmar Bergman presented by German actress Nastasja Kinski and to Italian director Marcello Mastroianni presented by Italian actress Giulietta Masina. English actor Sir Richard Attenborough received the Award of Merit, which was presented by Italian actress Gina Lollobrigida while two Special Awards were presented, one to Italian director Bernardo Bertolucci for The Last Emperor and one to Russian composer Yuri Khanon for the music of The Days of Eclipse.

Winners and nominees
The winners are in a yellow background and in bold.

Best European Film

Best European Director

Best European Actress

Best European Actor

Best European Supporting Actress

Best European Supporting Actor

Best European Young Actor or Actress

Best European Script

Best Young Film

Special Aspect Award

Lifetime Achievement Award
  Ingmar Bergman

  Marcello Mastroianni

Special Jury Award
  Bernardo Bertolucci - for The Last Emperor

  Yuri Khanon - The Days of Eclipse (Special Prize of the Jury for the music the film)

Award of Merit
  Sir Richard Attenborough

References

External links
Official site

European Film Awards ceremonies
1988 film awards
Culture in Berlin
1988 in Europe
1988 in German cinema